Thomas Hannan (December 25, 1757 - April 18, 1835) was an American Revolutionary War soldier and settler of the Kanawha River region of Virginia (now West Virginia). He was the first Anglo settler in what became Cabell County.

Biography

Early life
Thomas Hannan was born on December 25, 1757, in Frederick County, Virginia to Thomas Hannan and Lucretia Morris. In 1781, he married Elizabeth Henry.

Military service
Hannan first fought in Lord Dunmore's War at the Battle of Point Pleasant. At the start of the American Revolutionary War, he enlisted in the navy for one year. In 1781, several years after his initial term of enlistment, he was drafted into a rifle regiment and served at the Battle of Yorktown.

Western Virginia settler
After the war, Hannan was granted nearly 1,000 acres of land and moved west, becoming the first Anglo settler of Cabell County, West Virginia (the current location of Huntington, West Virginia) and one of the earliest settlers of the Kanawha and Ohio River Basin. He forged "Hannan's Trace," one of the original roads to the West from Virginia, the first roadway through what would later become Mason County, West Virginia and Cabell County, as well as a principal route from western West Virginia and the interior of Ohio. This path linked the then-capital of the Northwest Territory, Chillicothe, Ohio, to points in the Eastern United States. Hannan was a friend and neighbor of several other early settlers in the Kanawha Valley region, including Anne Baileyand Daniel Boone.

Legacy 
A number of institutions have been named for Hannan and his trail: 
Hannan Trace Elementary School in Crown City, Ohio
Hannan High School and Hannan Public Library in Ashton, West Virginia
Hannan District, Mason County, West Virginia

References

External links 

Highway markers from the West Virginia Memory Project.

1757 births
1835 deaths
People of Virginia in the American Revolution
West Virginia colonial people